Mjøndalen Station is located at the village of Mjøndalen in Nedre Eiker, Norway on the Sørlandet Line. Traditionally, this section of railway was regarded as part of the Randsfjorden Line. The station is served by local trains between Kongsberg via Oslo to Eidsvoll operated by Vy. The station was opened in 1866.

References

Railway stations in Buskerud
Railway stations on the Randsfjorden Line
Railway stations on the Sørlandet Line
Railway stations opened in 1866
1866 establishments in Norway